Jan Sierhuis is a painter, born in 1928, in Amsterdam, Netherlands.

References

1928 births
Living people
Dutch painters
Dutch male painters
Painters from Amsterdam
Academic staff of Gerrit Rietveld Academie
Officers of the Order of Orange-Nassau